Boyer is a ghost town in northeastern Churchill County, in the U.S. state of Nevada.

History
A post office was established at Boyer in 1896, and remained in operation until 1914. The community was named after Alva Boyer, a prospector and postmaster.

References

Ghost towns in Churchill County, Nevada
Ghost towns in Nevada